Joffre Óscar Zubía Miguez (born 8 February 1946, in Montevideo) is a retired Uruguayan football player. He has played for clubs in Ecuador and Uruguay, as well as the Uruguay football team in the 1970 World Cup.

Club career
Zubia started his career at River Plate de Montevideo, where he impressed the national team, earning a spot on the 1970 Uruguay World Cup team.

He then transferred to cross-town team Peñarol, where he was able to play in his first Copa Libertadores in 1971.

In 1972, Zubia made the move to Ecuador to play for LDU Quito, where he helped the team earn its first two national championships also becoming the national top scorer with 30 goals. He retired from football after his participation at the Quito club.

International career
Zubia had 15 caps for the Uruguay football team from 1968-1971. He was part of the squad that played in the 1970 World Cup, earning 2 caps against Italy & Sweden.

Later career
Since retiring from footballer, Zubia has stayed on with LDU Quito as a manager at the youth and senior level. He was the senior team coach from 1997-1998.
Currently works as a Scout and Coaching the minor leagues in LDU Quito

Honors
LDU Quito
Serie A: 1974, 1975

External links
 Oscar Zubia FIFA 
 Cyberalbos 1974
 Cyberalbos 1975

1946 births
Living people
Footballers from Montevideo
Uruguayan footballers
Uruguay international footballers
Uruguayan expatriate footballers
Association football midfielders
Uruguayan Primera División players
Ecuadorian Serie A players
Peñarol players
Club Atlético River Plate (Montevideo) players
L.D.U. Quito managers
L.D.U. Quito footballers
Expatriate footballers in Ecuador
1970 FIFA World Cup players
Uruguayan football managers
Expatriate football managers in Ecuador
Uruguayan expatriate sportspeople in Ecuador